John Francis Joseph McAuliffe, also known by his religious name Norbert McAuliffe, was an American missionary known for his work in Uganda. He was born in lower Manhattan, New York, on September 30, 1886. As a professed member of the Institute of the Brothers of the Sacred Heart, a Roman Catholic religious community of laymen, he would work in education for more than 50 years until his death on July 3, 1959, in Gulu, Uganda.

Childhood

McAuliffe was born to an Irish-American working-class family in lower Manhattan. His father, Daniel, was an immigrant from Ireland and worked on the New York City docks. His mother, Elizabeth or Lizzie, was Daniel's second wife and would raise five children – three survived to adulthood – Walter, John, and Elizabeth or Lillian. McAuliffe was baptized at St. Rose Church in lower Manhattan on November 7, 1886. His father died after a short illness in 1893 and he and his siblings would be orphaned with the unexpected death of their mother on October 10, 1895.

His sister, Elizabeth, went to stay with their half-brother, Daniel Jr, from their father's first marriage. McAuliffe (age 9) and his brother Walter (age 11) were accepted into St. Agnes Home in Sparkill, New York, on November 13, 1895. After St. Agnes Home was destroyed by fire in 1899, the two brothers were separated, with Walter going to the Catholic Protectory in New York City while McAuliffe went to the new St. Agnes Home established in Troy, New York.

In 1902, McAuliffe's life direction would change with a visit to the home by Stanislaus Keating. The missionary work of the brothers and especially their work in orphanages attracted John's attention. He was discharged from St. Agnes Home on April 30, 1902, and entered the formation house of the Brothers of the Sacred Heart in Metuchen, New Jersey, on May 1, 1902.

Formation and ministry in the United States

Already formed by the Dominican Sisters at Sparkill to a pattern of prayer and common life, McAuliffe adapted quickly to the spartan life led by the brothers at Metuchen. McAuliffe received the habit on November 14, 1902, and took the name, Norbert. He made his first commitment, or vows, on November 21, 1903, at Metuchen.

McAuliffe took to the brothers' mission of education immediately. He lived and worked with young people in schools in several places and grew more skilled in his teaching, eventually becoming the school principal and superior of the local community. Places he served during this time included Indianapolis, Indiana; Meridian, Mississippi; Muskogee, Oklahoma; and Bay St. Louis, Mississippi. He took perpetual vows at Bay St. Louis on July 10, 1910.

McAuliffe's expertise as an educator and formator of young people grew with the years and saw him also serve in Vicksburg, Mississippi; New Orleans, Louisiana; Donaldsonville, Louisiana and Washington, Indiana. 

During this period, the brothers rarely took up full-time studies but instead studied through an internal program and summer courses. McAuliffe completed his high school studies in 1915 and would graduate from the Normal School at Bay St Louis in 1917, qualified by the day's standards as a teacher. He attended summer programs at Loyola University in New Orleans, graduating with a Bachelor of Science degree in August 1921, and would later receive a lifetime Indiana Teacher's License in 1923.

Missionary commitment

McAuliffe took a break from his life as a teacher for a retreat and recollection period at the Grand Novitiate in Renteria, Spain, from September 1930 to April 1931. This time would also see his life take another major turn when he volunteered for the missions.

As a novice, McAuliffe had welcomed 45 French men, Brothers, and aspirants, who had been exiled due to anti-religious laws established in France at the time. Among them was Albertinus, who would serve as novice master, and as Provincial, he would ask McAuliffe to be the leader of the first group of missionaries to Uganda. Albertinus would later serve as the Superior General of the community and would be a close supporter of McAuliffe in his missionary endeavors.

Initially, McAuliffe was not among the group that had planned the first missionary foray into Uganda. Still, when the expedition leader fell ill, Albertinus turned to McAuliffe to take his place. McAuliffe and three other brothers, Oswin, Camillus, and Coleman, left the USA on July 23, 1931, traveling by boat from New York to Le Havre in France and then on to Africa. They arrived in Gulu, Uganda, on August 29, 1931.

Life in Africa – Part 1

Initially, the brothers served at St. Louis College, later St. Aloysius College, in Gulu, establishing both their reputation as educators and gaining a foothold in the local communities where they served. A later expansion of this project included a junior high school, St. Joseph, and an agricultural school. It was difficult, isolated work but much appreciated by the people and by the Church authorities.   

Already though, among the brothers and especially among the local Acholi people, McAuliffe had the reputation as a holy and prayerful man. The local people had begun to call him Dano Ma Lego, “the man who prays.”

The War Years 1939–1945

McAuliffe arrived in New York for his first visit home in ten years on October 15, 1939. McAuliffe could not have timed his return home at a more difficult time. With the outbreak of World War II in 1939, as a British colony, Uganda was in the midst of it. Returning to his missionary work would not be possible. Instead, McAuliffe was assigned as the Director at Metuchen, New Jersey, the formation center in the United States where he had been formed. During these six years, he sustained what was, in fact, an impoverished community, living on the food it grew during difficult social times.

Yet, many of the witnesses of that period describe McAuliffe's demeanor. His characteristic virtue was charity. He gave the best he had to people with humility and kindness. These years were not a loss for McAuliffe, and he grew in his interior life, and these years were also a blessing for those who worked and lived with him.

Life in Africa – Part 2

On December 31, 1945, McAuliffe sailed from New York back to his missionary work in Uganda, arriving on February 9, 1946. After initially working at the Brothers’ high school in Gulu, McAuliffe established a more permanent setting for young men's formation as Brothers. Soon after, he was appointed the Brothers' leader, or Director-General, guiding the work of the Brothers throughout eastern Africa.

When he arrived back, St. Aloysius College had moved to Nyapea, Uganda, during the war years. McAuliffe returned to develop St. Joseph College in Gulu. Under McAuliffe's leadership, the brothers would spread their work far and wide, including the development of new schools in Okaru, Sudan, and Nyeri, Kenya, and a formation center in Alokolum near Gulu, in Uganda.   

In 1952, McAuliffe was now 65 years old and was appointed as the leader for a third term. This term was short-lived due to illness and a quick return to the US for treatment. When McAuliffe had returned to Africa in 1946, there were six brothers. By the end of his term in 1954, there were 21 missionaries, 6 African novices, and 53 postulants. In 1955, he saw the first Ugandan novices take their vows. A new generation had begun to take up the baton. According to witnesses, McAuliffe became the novice teacher and taught as much by his life and by his words. 

On July 3, 1959, after a few days of illness, McAuliffe passed away. The Bishop of Gulu blessed the body and planned the mass. As a sign of McAuliffe's esteem, the brothers sat in the chancel of the church while the attending priests sat in the body of the church, so revered was McAuliffe.

Cause for sainthood

From his passing, the brothers, students, and local people acclaimed McAuliffe's life and ministry as holy and exemplary. They sustained their devotion to his memory within the Gulu diocese and beyond. The Ugandan bishops had invoked his name as an intercessor for all Ugandans. As a result, between June 16–July 13, 1994, the diocesan investigation reviewed his life and met with the witnesses to that life of faith. On June 9, 1995, the Holy See affirmed the diocesan investigation's outcome, according McAuliffe the title, Servant of God.

A detailed examination of his life, of witnesses, of the history of the period, and the person's writings was undertaken. The result, known as the positio, was then examined by the Congregation for the Causes of Saints in Rome. On June 23, 2015, the initial review affirmed the experience of the many witnesses. On May 8, 2018, the Congregation's consultors affirmed that McAuliffe had exhibited the theological and cardinal virtues to a heroic degree. Finally, Pope Francis affirmed that result on May 19, 2018, declaring the heroicity of McAuliffe's virtues and thus bestowing upon him the title of Venerable in the church.

References

1886 births
1959 deaths
American Roman Catholic missionaries
American Christian monks
People from Manhattan
Roman Catholic missionaries in Uganda
American expatriates in Uganda
Venerated Catholics by Pope Francis
Catholics from New York (state)
American venerated Catholics